Death: The Time of Your Life is a three-issue comic book mini-series written by Neil Gaiman, one of many spinoffs from his series The Sandman.  It was illustrated by Chris Bachalo and Mark Buckingham, and features an introduction by Claire Danes. The series ran from April to July 1996 and has been collected into a single volume.

This story brings back characters Donna Foxglove and her partner Hazel McNamara from a previous Sandman series of stories, A Game of You.

Plot
As the story opens, Foxglove is a very successful singer-songwriter currently on a very important tour. Her relationship with Hazel is slowly unravelling, due mainly to the building pressures of her newfound fame.  One night, Hazel's son, Alvie (an accidental result of Hazel's one and only heterosexual encounter), dies.  When Death, personified as a teenage girl in a goth dress, shows up to take him, Hazel makes a promise in desperation.  The promise is that either Hazel or Fox will take Alvie's place when Death returns, if only she will let Alvie live for a while longer. The story touches upon the pressures of living private and public lives, as well as fidelity, love, and duty.

Awards
The original miniseries was a top vote-getter for the Comics Buyer's Guide Fan Award for Favorite Limited Series for 1997.  The series also was awarded the GLAAD Media Award for Outstanding Comic Book in 1997, the first year the category was competitive.

Other Sandman spin-offs
Death: The High Cost of Living
Destiny: A Chronicle of Deaths Foretold

See also
List of The Sandman spinoffs

References

Other sources

External links
Comics Buyer's Guide Fan Awards

1996 comics debuts
Comics about death
Fantasy comics
LGBT-related comics
Lesbian-related comics
GLAAD Media Award for Outstanding Comic Book winners
The Sandman (comic book)
Vertigo Comics limited series
Gothic comics